Frobel, Fröbel, or Froebel may refer to:

People
 Doug Frobel (born 1959), major league baseball player
 Friedrich Fröbel (1782–1852), German (Thuringian) pedagogue who laid the foundation for modern education
  (1807-1894), German pedagogue, nephew of Friedrich Fröbel
  (1815–1900), German pedagogue, wife of Friedrich Fröbel
 Julius Fröbel (1805–1893), German geologist and mineralogist, journalist, and democratic revolutionary
 Kai Frobel, German environmental ecologist

Other uses
 10835 Fröbel, a main belt asteroid named after him
 Froebel star, one of many names of a Christmas decoration made of paper, named after him
 The German name of Wróblin, Opole Voivodeship, Poland

See also
 

Surnames of Slavic origin